The Seewarte Seamounts, also known as the Seewarte Seamount Chain, Atlantis-Great Meteor Seamount Chain and the Atlantis-Plato-Cruiser-Great Meteor Seamount Group, is a north-south trending group of extinct submarine volcanoes in the northern Atlantic Ocean south-southeast of the Corner Rise Seamounts.

The Seewarte Seamounts have been interpreted to have formed as a result of the African Plate traveling over the New England hotspot.

Seamounts
The Seewarte Seamounts include:

Closs Seamount
Little Meteor Seamount
Great Meteor Seamount
Hyères Seamount
Irving Seamount
Cruiser Tablemount
Plato Seamount
Atlantis Seamount
Tyro Seamount

See also
Corner Rise Seamounts
New England Seamounts

References

Seamounts of the Atlantic Ocean
Hotspot volcanoes
Extinct volcanoes
Seamount chains